Vasileios Hatzis or Vassileios Chatzis (1870 – 1915) was a Greek painter who was best known for his seascapes.

Life
Vasileios Hatzis was born in 1870 in Kastoria. His family was involved in shipping, and he spent his childhood in Patras. From 1886 to 1893 he studied at the Athens School of Fine Arts under Nikiforos Lytras and Konstantinos Volanakis. During the Balkan Wars of 1912–13 the government assigned him to the navy, where he portrayed action scenes of the Greek fleet. He died in Athens in 1915.

Work
Hatzis is primarily known for his seascapes, but also painted landscapes and genre scenes from the life of farmers and fishermen. His work includes both academic and en plein air styles. The influence of impressionism may be detected in his work. He first exhibited in Athens in 1899, and his works were shown in group exhibitions in Athens (1902, 1907, 1909, 1910) and Alexandria (1903, 1906). A solo exhibition was held soon after his death at the Zappeion hall in Athens that showed more than 260 works.

Notes

Sources

1870 births
1915 deaths
Greek painters
People from Kastoria
19th-century Greek painters
20th-century Greek painters